The 2014 International Challenge Cup was held from March 6 to 9, 2014 in The Hague. Skaters competed in the disciplines of men's singles, ladies' singles on the senior, advanced novice, and basic novice A levels, and pair skating at the senior and junior levels.

Senior results

Men

Ladies

Pairs

Junior results

Men

Ladies

Pairs

Advanced novice results

Boys

Girls

Basic novice A results

Boys

Girls

References

External links
 2014 International Challenge Cup official site (archived)
 Starting orders and results
 Challenge Cup 2014 at International Skating Union

International Challenge Cup
International Challenge Cup, 2014
International Challenge Cup